Roger Ferry (born 1 December 1932), is a French chess player, three times French Chess Championship medalist (1961, 1962, 1966).

Biography
In 1960s Roger Ferry was one of the leading French chess players. He took part in the individual French Chess Championship finals many times and won three bronze medals (1961, 1962, 1966).

Roger Ferry played for France in the Chess Olympiads:
 In 1962, at first reserve board in the 15th Chess Olympiad in Varna (+3, =6, -2),
 In 1968, at first reserve board in the 18th Chess Olympiad in Lugano (+4, =3, -1).

Roger Ferry continued to participate in high-level competitions until the mid-2000s.

References

External links

Roger Ferry chess games at 365chess.com

1932 births
Living people
French chess players
Chess Olympiad competitors